This article lists the in the water and on the water forms of aquatic sports for 2015.

Aquatics

Open water swimming
 February 1 – September 6: 2015 Open Water Swimming Grand Prix
 February 1 in  Santa Fe–Coronda
 Event cancelled.
 February 8 in  Villa Urquiza–Paraná
 Men's winner:  Mario Sanzullo
 Women's winner:  Alice Franco
 April 25 in  Cozumel
 Men's winner:  Ferry Weertman
 Women's winner:  Sharon van Rouwendaal
 July 25 in  Lac St-Jean
 Men's winner:  Xavier Desharnais
 Women's winner:  Pilar Geijo
 August 29 in  Lake Ohrid
 Men's winner:  Evgenij Pop Acev
 Women's winner:  Alice Franco
 September 6 in  Capri–Napoli (final)
 Men's winner:  Damián Blaum
 Women's winner:  Alice Franco

Marathon swimming
 February 7 – October 17: 2015 FINA 10 km Marathon Swimming World Cup
 February 7 in  Patagones–Viedma
 Men's winner:  Simone Ruffini
 Women's winner:  Rachele Bruni
 March 13 in  Abu Dhabi
 Men's winner:  Axel Reymond
 Women's winner:  Rachele Bruni
 April 18 in  Nouméa
 Men's winner:  Rhys Mainstone
 Women's winner:  Aurélie Muller
 May 2 in  Cozumel
 Men's winner:  Jack Burnell
 Women's winner:  Haley Anderson
 June 20 in  Balatonfüred
 Men's winner:  Jack Burnell
 Women's winner:  Ana Marcela Cunha
 June 27 in  Setúbal
 Men's winner:  Chip Peterson
 Women's winner:  Rachele Bruni
 July 23 in  Lac St-Jean
 Men's winner:  Chip Peterson
 Women's winner:  Christine Jennings
 July 30 in  Lac Megantic
 Men's winner:  Rhys Mainstone
 Women's winner:  Rachele Bruni
 October 11 in  Chun'an, Hangzhou
 Men's winner:  Allan do Carmo
 Women's winner:  Ana Marcela Cunha
 Men's winner:  Christian Reichert
 Women's winner:  Keri-Anne Payne
 Men's winner:  Allan do Carmo
 Women's winner:  Keri-Anne Payne

Diving
 February 20 – November 1: 2015 FINA Diving Grand Prix
 February 20–22: Grand Prix #1 in  Rostock
 Men's 3m Springboard winner:  Jahir Ocampo
 Women's 3m Springboard winner:  Qu Lin
 Men's 10m Platform winner:  Sascha Klein
 Women's 10m Platform winner:  Meaghan Benfeito
 Men's Synchronized 3m Springboard winners:  Oleksandr Horshkovozov / Illya Kvasha
 Women's Synchronized 3m Springboard winners:  Qu Lin / Wu Chunting
 Men's Synchronized 10m Platform winners:  Patrick Hausding / Sascha Klein
 Women's Synchronized 10m Platform winners:  Meaghan Benfeito / Roseline Filion
 April 2–5: Grand Prix #2 in  León, Guanajuato
 Men's 3m Springboard winner:  Jahir Ocampo
 Women's 3m Springboard winner:  WU Chunting 
 Men's 10m Platform winner:  Jonathan Ruvalcaba
 Women's 10m Platform winner:  JI Siyu
 Men's Synchronized 3m Springboard winners:  Jonathan Ruvalcaba / Carlos Moreno Arellano
 Women's Synchronized 3m Springboard winners:  Lin Qu / WU Chunting
 Men's Synchronized 10m Platform winners:  WANG Anqi / HUANG Bowen 
 Women's Synchronized 10m Platform winners:  Gabriela Agundez / Karla Rivas
 Mixed Synchronized 3m Springboard winners:  LIU Lingrui / HU Qiyuan
 Mixed Synchronized 10m Platform winners:  Alejandra Estrella Madrigal / Diego Balleza
 April 9–12: Grand Prix #3 in  Gatineau
 Men's 3m Springboard winner:  Jahir Ocampo
 Women's 3m Springboard winner:  WU Chunting 
 Men's 10m Platform winner:  Diego Balleza
 Women's 10m Platform winner:  JI Siyu
 Men's Synchronized 3m Springboard winners:  François Imbeau-Dulac / Philippe Gagne
 Women's Synchronized 3m Springboard winners:  Lin Qu / WU Chunting
 Men's Synchronized 10m Platform winners:  Vincent Riendeau / Philippe Gagne
 Women's Synchronized 10m Platform winners:  DING Yaying / JI Siyu
 Mixed Synchronized 3m Springboard winners:  François Imbeau-Dulac / Jennifer Abel
 Mixed Synchronized 10m Platform winners:  Vincent Riendeau / Meaghan Benfeito 
 April 16–19: Grand Prix #4 in  San Juan
 Men's 3m Springboard winner:  Ken Terauchi
 Women's 3m Springboard winner:  Minami Itahashi
 Men's 10m Platform winner:  HU Qiyuan
 Women's 10m Platform winner:  JI Siyu
 Men's Synchronized 3m Springboard winners:  Sho Sakai / Ken Terauchi
 Women's Synchronized 3m Springboard winners:  Lin Qu / WU Chunting
 Men's Synchronized 10m Platform winners:  HUANG Bowen / WANG Anqi
 Women's Synchronized 10m Platform winners:  JI Siyu / DING Yaying 
 Mixed Synchronized 3m Springboard winners  Loh Zhiayi / Mohammad Syafiq
 Mixed Synchronized 10m Platform winners:  Ingrid Oliveira / Luiz Felipe Outerelo
 June 26–28: Grand Prix #5 in  Madrid
 Men's 3m Springboard winner:  Andrzej Rzeszutek
 Women's 3m Springboard winner:  XU Zhihuan
 Men's 10m Platform winner:  HUANG Bowen
 Women's 10m Platform winner:  JI Siyu
 Men's Synchronized 3m Springboard winners:  WEI Zhong / DIAO Zhiguang
 Women's Synchronized 3m Springboard winners:  JIA Dongjin / XU Zhihuan
 Men's Synchronized 10m Platform winners:  HUANG Zigan / CAO Lizhi
 Women's Synchronized 10m Platform winners:  DING Yaying / JI Siyu
 July 3–5: Grand Prix #6 in  Bolzano
 Men's 3m Springboard winner:  WEI Zhong
 Women's 3m Springboard winner:  XU Zhihuan
 Men's 10m Platform winner:  Yu Okamoto
 Women's 10m Platform winner:  DING Yaying
 Men's Synchronized 3m Springboard winners:  DIAO Zhiguang / WEI Zhong
 Women's Synchronized 3m Springboard winners:  XU Zhihuan / JIA Dongjin
 Men's Synchronized 10m Platform winners:  HUANG Zigan / CAO Lizhi
 Women's Synchronized 10m Platform winners:  JI Siyu / DING Yaying
 Mixed Synchronized 3m Springboard winners:  Melissa Citrini-Beaulieu / Marc Sabourin-Germain
 Mixed Synchronized 10m Platform winners:  Diego Balleza / Paola Pineda
 October 16–18: Grand Prix #7 in 
 Men's 3m Springboard winner:  PENG Jianfeng
 Women's 3m Springboard winner:  WU Chunting
 Men's 10m Platform winner:  WANG Anqi
 Women's 10m Platform winner:  Lois Toulson
 Men's Synchronized 3m Springboard winners:  LI Yanan / ZHONG Yuming
 Women's Synchronized 3m Springboard winners:  XU Zhihuan / WU Chunting
 Men's Synchronized 10m Platform winners:  GAO Ang / WANG Anqi
 Women's Synchronized 10m Platform winners:  Wang Ying / Wang Han
 Mixed Synchronized 3m Springboard winners:  LI Yannan / WU Chunting
 Mixed Synchronized 10m Platform winners:  YING Wang / WANG Anqi
 October 23–25: Grand Prix #8 in  Kuala Lumpur
 Men's 3m Springboard winner:  PENG Jianfeng
 Women's 3m Springboard winner:  WU Chunting
 Men's 10m Platform winner:  WANG Anqi
 Women's 10m Platform winner:  Wang Ying
 Men's Synchronized 3m Springboard winners:  Chew Yiwei / Ahmad Azman
 Women's Synchronized 3m Springboard winners:  WU Chunting / XU Zhihuan
 Men's Synchronized 10m Platform winners:  GAO Ang / WANG Anqi
 Women's Synchronized 10m Platform winners:  Cheong Jun Hoong / Nur Dhabitah Sabri
 Mixed Synchronized 3m Springboard winners:  WU Chunting / LI Yanan
 Mixed Synchronized 10m Platform winners:  Chew Yiwei / Cheong Jun Hoong
 October 29 – November 1: Grand Prix #9 (final) in  Gold Coast
 Men's 3m Springboard winner:  HUANG Bowen 
 Women's 3m Springboard winner:  Wang Han
 Men's 10m Platform winner:  HUANG Zigan
 Women's 10m Platform winner:  JI Siyu
 Men's Synchronized 3m Springboard winners:  Stephan Feck / Patrick Hausding
 Women's Synchronized 3m Springboard winners:  Samantha Mills / Esther Qin
 Men's Synchronized 10m Platform winners:  Patrick Hausding / Sascha Klein
 Women's Synchronized 10m Platform winners:  JI Siyu / DING Yaying
 Mixed Synchronized 3m Springboard winners:  Ng Yan Yee / Muhammad Syafiq Puteh
 Mixed Synchronized 10m Platform winners:  Nicholas Jeffree / Lara Tarvit
 March 13 – May 31: 2015 FINA Diving World Series
 March 13–15: World Series #1 in  Beijing
 Men's 3m Springboard winner:  He Chong
 Women's 3m Springboard winner:  Shi Tingmao
 Men's 10m Platform winner:  Yang Jian
 Women's 10m Platform winner:  Liu Huixia
 Men's Synchronized 3m Springboard winners:  Cao Yuan / Qin Kai
 Women's Synchronized 3m Springboard winners:  Shi Tingmao / Wu Minxia
 Men's Synchronized 10m Platform winners:  Chen Aisen / Lin Yue
 Women's Synchronized 10m Platform winners:  Chen Ruolin / Liu Huixia
 Mixed Synchronized 3m Springboard winners:  Chen Aisen / He Zi
 Mixed Synchronized 10m Platform winners:  LIAN Jie / TAI Xiaohu 
 March 19–21: World Series #2 in  Dubai
 Men's 3m Springboard winner:  Jack Laugher
 Women's 3m Springboard winner:  SHI Tingmao
 Men's 10m Platform winner:  Qiu Bo
 Women's 10m Platform winner:  Chen Ruolin 
 Men's Synchronized 3m Springboard winners:  Qin Kai / CAO Yuan
 Women's Synchronized 3m Springboard winners:  WU Minxia / SHI Tingmao
 Men's Synchronized 10m Platform winners:  Lin Yue / Chen Aisen
 Women's Synchronized 10m Platform winners:  Chen Ruolin / LIU Huixia
 Mixed Synchronized 3m Springboard winners:  He Zi / Chen Aisen
 Mixed Synchronized 10m Platform winners:  TAI Xiaohu / LIAN Jie
 April 24–26: World Series #3 in  Kazan
 Men's 3m Springboard winner:  Jack Laugher
 Women's 3m Springboard winner:  SHI Tingmao
 Men's 10m Platform winner:  Qiu Bo
 Women's 10m Platform winner:  Meaghan Benfeito
 Men's Synchronized 3m Springboard winners:  Qin Kai / CAO Yuan
 Women's Synchronized 3m Springboard winners:  WU Minxia / SHI Tingmao
 Men's Synchronized 10m Platform winners:  Lin Yue / Chen Aisen
 Women's Synchronized 10m Platform winners:  Chen Ruolin / LIU Huixia
 Mixed Synchronized 3m Springboard winners:  YANG Hao / WANG Han
 Mixed Synchronized 10m Platform winners:  LIAN Junjie / Si Yajie
 May 1–3: World Series #4 in  London
 Men's 3m Springboard winner:  Evgeny Kuznetsov
 Women's 3m Springboard winner:  SHI Tingmao
 Men's 10m Platform winner:  Tom Daley
 Women's 10m Platform winner:  Roseline Filion
 Men's Synchronized 3m Springboard winners:  Qin Kai / CAO Yuan
 Women's Synchronized 3m Springboard winners:  WU Minxia / SHI Tingmao
 Men's Synchronized 10m Platform winners:  LIN Yue / CHEN Aisen
 Women's Synchronized 10m Platform winners:  CHEN Ruolin / LIU Huixia
 Mixed Synchronized 3m Springboard winners:  YANG Hao / WANG Ha
 Mixed Synchronized 10m Platform winners:  LIAN Junjie / Si Yajie
 May 22–24: World Series #5 in  Windsor, Ontario
 Men's 3m Springboard winner:  Jack Laugher
 Women's 3m Springboard winner:  He Zi
 Men's 10m Platform winner:  Yang Jian
 Women's 10m Platform winner:  REN Qian
 Men's Synchronized 3m Springboard winners:  He Chao / He Chong
 Women's Synchronized 3m Springboard winners:  He Zi / Wang Han
 Men's Synchronized 10m Platform winners:  Yang Jian / Lin Yue
 Women's Synchronized 10m Platform winners:  Si Yajie / LIAN Jie
 Mixed Synchronized 3m Springboard winners:  He Zi / Lin Yue
 Mixed Synchronized 10m Platform winners:  LIAN Jie / TAI Xiaohu
 May 29–31: World Series #6 (final) in  Mérida, Yucatán
 Men's 3m Springboard winner:  Rommel Pacheco
 Women's 3m Springboard winner:  HE Zi
 Men's 10m Platform winner:  Yang Jian
 Women's 10m Platform winner:  SI Yajie
 Men's Synchronized 3m Springboard winners:  HE Chao / HE Chong
 Women's Synchronized 3m Springboard winners:  HE Zi / WANG Han
 Men's Synchronized 10m Platform winners:  Germán Sánchez / Iván García
 Women's Synchronized 10m Platform winners:  SI Yajie / LIAN Jie
 Mixed Synchronized 3m Springboard winners:  Jennifer Abel / François Imbeau-Dulac
 Mixed Synchronized 10m Platform winners:  TAI Xiaohu / LIAN Jie
 May 8–10: 2015 FINA High Diving World Cup in  Cozumel
 Men's High Dive winner:  Orlando Duque
 Women's High Dive winner:  Rachelle Simpson
 June 9–14: 2015 European Diving Championships in  Rostock
  and  won 3 gold medals each. Russia won the overall medal tally.

FINA Swimming World Cup
 August 11 – November 7: 2015 FINA Swimming World Cup
 August 11 & 12: World Cup #1 in  Moscow
 The  won both the gold and overall medal tallies.
 Men's Overall Points Leader #1:  Cameron van der Burgh
 Women's Overall Points Leader #1:  Katinka Hosszú
 August 15 & 16: World Cup #2 in  Chartres/Paris
  won the gold medal tally. The  won the overall medal tally.
 Men's Overall Points Leader #2:  Cameron van der Burgh
 Women's Overall Points Leader #2:  Katinka Hosszú
 September 25 & 26: World Cup #3 in 
  and  won 9 gold medals each. Australia won the overall medal tally.
 Men's Overall Points Leader #3:  Cameron van der Burgh
 Women's Overall Points Leader #3:  Katinka Hosszú
 September 29 & 30: World Cup #4 in  Beijing
  won both the gold and overall medal tallies.
 Men's Overall Points Leader #4:  Cameron van der Burgh
 Women's Overall Points Leader #4:  Katinka Hosszú
 October 3 & 4: World Cup #5 in 
 Note: 17 swimming events were cancelled, due to bad air quality at the site. Therefore, only 15 events were contested.
  won both the gold and overall medal tallies.
 Men's Overall Points Leader #5:  Cameron van der Burgh
 Women's Overall Points Leader #5:  Katinka Hosszú
 October 28 & 29: World Cup #6 in  Tokyo
  won both the gold and overall medal tallies.
 Men's Overall Points Leader #6:  Cameron van der Burgh
 Women's Overall Points Leader #6:  Katinka Hosszú
 November 2 & 3: World Cup #7 in  Doha
  won the gold medal tally. The  won the overall medal tally.
 Men's Overall Points Leader #7:  Cameron van der Burgh
 Women's Overall Points Leader #7:  Katinka Hosszú
 November 6 & 7: World Cup #8 (final) in  Dubai
  won the gold medal tally. The  won the overall medal tally.
 Men's Overall Points Champion:  Cameron van der Burgh
 Women's Overall Points Champion:  Katinka Hosszú

Synchronized swimming
 December 11–13: 2015 FINA Synchronized Swimming World Trophy in  Shaoxing
  won both the gold and overall medal tallies.

Aquatics world championships
 July 13–19: 2015 IPC Swimming World Championships in  Glasgow
  won both the gold and overall medal tallies.
 July 24 – August 9: 2015 World Aquatics Championships in  Kazan
  won both the gold and overall medal tallies.
 August 5–16: 2015 FINA World Masters Championships in  Kazan
 For results, click here.
 August 25–30: 2015 FINA World Junior Swimming Championships in 
 Gold Medal count: 
 Championships Trophy: The 
 Men's overall ranking:  Anton Chupkov
 Women's overall ranking:  Viktoriya Zeynep Gunes
 FINA Trophy:  Viktoriya Zeynep Gunes

Canoeing

Canoe sprint (flatwater)
 May 15–31: 2015 ICF Canoe Sprint World Cup
 May 15–17: World Cup #1 in  Montemor-o-Velho

  won the gold medal tally. Canada and  won 9 overall medals each.
 May 22–24: World Cup #2 in  Duisburg
 Host nation, and  won 6 gold medals each. Germany won the overall medal tally.
 May 29–31: World Cup #3 (final) in  Copenhagen
  won both the gold and overall medal tallies.
 May 1–3: 2015 Canoe Sprint European Championships in  Račice

  won the gold medal tally. Germany, and  won 11 overall medals each.
 July 24–26: 2015 ICF Junior and U23 Canoe Sprint World Championships in  Montemor-o-Velho
 U23:  won both the gold and overall medal tallies.
 Junior: Hungary won the gold medal tally. Hungary and  won 7 overall medals each.
 August 19–23: 2015 ICF Canoe Sprint World Championships in  Milan
 Main event:  won the gold medal tally.  won the overall medal tally.
 Paracanoe:  and  won 3 gold medals each. Brazil and  won 7 overall medals each.
  and the  won 2 gold medals each.  won the overall medal tally.

Whitewater slalom (canoe)
 June 19 – August 16: 2015 Canoe Slalom World Cup
 June 19–21: World Cup #1 in  Prague
 The  won both the gold and overall medal tallies.
 June 26–28: World Cup #2 in  Kraków
 Men's C1 winner:  Matej Beňuš
 Men's K1 winner:  Vavřinec Hradilek
 Women's C1 winner:  Jessica Fox
 Women's K1 winner:  Maialen Chourraut
 Men's C2 winners:  Jonáš Kašpar / Marek Šindler
 July 3–5: World Cup #3 in  Liptovský Mikuláš
  won both the gold and overall medal tallies.
 August 7–9: World Cup #4 in  La Seu d'Urgell
  won both the gold and overall medal tallies.
 August 14–16: World Cup #5 (final) in  Pau
  won the gold medal tally. France and  won 5 overall medals each.
 January 31 & February 1: 2015 Oceania Canoe Slalom Championships in  Mangahao River
 Men's Canoe Singles:  Liam Smedley
 Men's Canoe Doubles:  Daniel Munro and Luke Robinson
 Women's Canoe Singles:  Rosalyn Lawrence
 Men's Kayak:  Michael Dawson
 Women's Kayak:  Rosalyn Lawrence
 April 22–26: 2015 ICF Junior and U23 Canoe Slalom World Championships in  Foz do Iguaçu

The Czech Republic won the overall medal tally.
 May 28–31: 2015 European Senior Canoe Slalom Championships in  Markkleeberg
  won the gold medal tally.  and  won 6 overall medals each.
 August 26–30: 2015 European Junior and U23 Canoe Slalom Championships in  Kraków
 The  won both the gold and overall medal tallies.
 September 16–20: 2015 ICF Canoe Slalom World Championships in  London (at the Lee Valley White Water Centre)
 Men's C1 winner:  David Florence
 Men's Team C1 winners:  (Michal Martikán, Alexander Slafkovský, Matej Beňuš)
 Men's C2 winners:  (Franz Anton, Jan Benzien)
 Men's Team C2 winners:  (Pierre Picco, Hugo Biso, Gauthier Klauss, Matthieu Péché, Yves Prigent, Loic Kervella)
 Men's K1 winner:  Jiří Prskavec
 Men's Team K1 winners:  (Jiří Prskavec, Vavřinec Hradilek, Ondřej Tunka)
 Women's C1 winner:  Jessica Fox
 Women's Team C1 winners:  (Jessica Fox, Rosalyn Lawrence, Alison Borrows)
 Women's K1 winner:  Kateřina Kudějová
 Women's Team K1 winners:  (Kateřina Kudějová, Veronika Vojtova, Štěpánka Hilgertová)
 Men's Canoe Singles winner:  David Florence
 Men's Kayak Singles winner:  Mathieu Biazizzo
 Men's Canoe Doubles winners:  Sašo Taljat / Luka Božič
 Women's Kayak Singles winner:  Violetta Oblinger-Peters

Rowing

World Rowing Cup
 May 8 – July 12: 2015 World Rowing Cup Events
 May 8–10: 2015 World Rowing Cup #1 in  Bled (Lake Bled)

  won the gold medal tally.  won the overall medal tally.
 June 19–21: 2015 World Rowing Cup #2 in  Varese (Lake Varese)
  won both the gold and overall medal tallies.
 July 10–12: 2015 World Rowing Cup #3 (final) in  Lucerne (Lake Rotsee)
  won both the gold and overall medal tallies.

Other rowing competitions
 January 31: 2015 European Rowing Indoor Championships in  Szczecin
 Men's Open winner:  Rolandas Maščinskas
 Women's Open winner:  Olena Buryak
 Men's Lightweight winner:  Artur Mikołajczewski
 Women's Lightweight winner:  Donata Vištartaitė
 March 1: FISA World Indoor Rowing Championships 2015 in  Boston
 Men's Open Lightweight winner:  Dánjal Martin Hofgaard
 Men's Open Heavyweight winner:  Ángel Fournier
 Women's Open Lightweight winner:  Erin Roberts
 Women's Open Heavyweight winner:  Kaisa Pajusalu
 May 23 & 24: 2015 European Rowing Junior Championships in  Račice
  won the gold medal tally.  won the overall medal tally.
 May 29–31: 2015 European Rowing Championships in  Poznań
  won both the gold and overall medal tallies.
 July 22–26: 2015 World Rowing U23 Championships in  Plovdiv
  won the gold medal tally. Italy, and  won 6 overall medals each.
 August 5–9: 2015 World Rowing Junior Championships in  Rio de Janeiro (Olympic Test Event)
  won both the gold and overall medal tally.
 August 30 – September 6: 2015 World Rowing Championships in  Lac d'Aiguebelette
  and  won 5 gold medals each. Great Britain won the overall medal tally.
 September 10–13: 2015 World Rowing Masters Regatta in  Hazewinkel
 For Thursday's results, click here.
 For Friday's results, click here.
 For Saturday's results, click here.
 For Sunday's results, click here.
 September 24–28: 2015 ARF Asian Rowing Championships in  Beijing
  won both the gold and overall medal tallies.
 October 5–11: 2015 FISA African Olympic Qualification Regatta and the 2015 African Rowing Junior and Senior Championships in  Tunis
 FISA African Olympic Qualification Regatta (October 5–7)
 Men's Single Sculls winner:  Elkhalek Abd Elbanna
 Women's Single Sculls winner:  Micheen Thornycroft
 Men's Lightweight Double Sculls winners:  (Emira Omar Elsobhy / Mohamed Nofel)
 Women's Lightweight Double Sculls winners:  (Nour El Hiuda Ettaieb / Khadija Krimi)
 FISA African Rowing Junior and Senior Championships (October 9–11)

  and  won 5 gold medals each. Egypt won the overall medal tally.
 November 13–15: 2015 World Rowing Coastal Championships in  Lima
  won the gold medal tally.  won the overall medal tally.

Sailing

ISAF Sailing World Cup
 December 7, 2014 – November 1, 2015: 2014–15 ISAF Sailing World Cup
 December 7–14, 2014: World Cup #1 in  Melbourne
 Host nation, won both the gold and overall medal tallies.
 January 24–31, 2015: World Cup #2 in  Miami
  won both the gold and overall medal tallies.
 April 20–26, 2015: World Cup #3 in  Hyères
 Host nation, won both the gold and overall medal tallies.
 June 8–14, 2015: World Cup #4 in  Weymouth and Portland
 Host nation, won both the gold and overall medal tallies.
 September 14–20, 2015: World Cup #5 in  Qingdao
 Host nation, won both the gold and overall medal tallies.
 October 27 – November 1, 2015: World Cup #6 (final) in  Abu Dhabi
  won the gold medal tally. Great Britain and  won 4 overall medals each.

EUROSAF Champions Sailing Cup
 March 30 – October 9, 2015: EUROSAF Champions Sailing Cup 2015
 March 30 – April 4: #1 EUROSAF Champions Sailing Cup in  Palma de Mallorca
 Men's RS:X winner:  Kiran Badloe
 Men's Laser winner:  Philipp Buhl
 Men's Finn winner:  Giles Scott
 Men's 470 winners:  (Lucas Calabrese, Juan de la Fuente)
 Men's 49er winners:  (Peter Burling, Blair Tuke)
 Women's RS:X winner:  Charline Picon
 Women's Laser Radial winner:  Evi Van Acker
 Women's 470 winners:  (Jo Aleh, Polly Powrie)
 Women's 49er FX winners:  (Maiken Foght Schütt, Anne-Julie Schütt)
 Mixed Nacra winners:  (Billy Besson, Marie Riou)
 May 6–10: #2 EUROSAF Champions Sailing Cup in  Riva del Garda
 Men's Laser winner:  Jean-Baptiste Bernaz
 Women's Laser Radial winner:  Evi Van Acker
 Men's 470 winners:  (Simon Sivitz Kosuta, Jas Farneti)
 Women's 470 winners:  (Tina Mrak, Veronika Macarol)
 Men's 49er winners:  (Ruggi Tita, Giacomo Cavalli)
 Women's 49er FX winners:  (Giulia Conti, Francesca Clapcich)
 Mixed Nacra winners:  (Vittorio Bissaro, Silvia Sicouri)
 Men's RS:X winner:  Daniele Benedetti
 Women's RS:X winner:  Meg Berenice
 2.4 Metre winners:  Antonio Squizzato
 May 26–30: Delta Lloyd Regatta in  Medemblik
 Men's RS:X winner:  Paweł Tarnowski
 Men's Laser winner:  Matthew Wearn
 Men's Finn winner:  Pieter-Jan Postma
 Men's 470 winner:  (Johan Molund, Sebastian Östling)
 Men's 49er winner:  Diego Botin
 Women's RS:X winner:  Maja Dziarnowska
 Women's Laser Radial winner:  Marit Bouwmeester
 Women's 470 winner:  Sophie Weguelin
 Women's 49er FX winner:  Annemiek Bekkering
 Mixed Nacra 17 winners:  (Lin Ea Cenholt, Christian Peter Lübeck)
 SKUD 18 winners:  (Daniel Fitzgibbon, Liesl Tesch)
 Sonar winner:  Colin Harrison
 2.4 Metre winners:  Damien Seguin
 June 10–14: EUROSAF Champions Cup in  Weymouth and Portland
 Men's RS:X winner:  Nick Dempsey
 Men's Laser winner:  Philipp Buhl
 Men's Finn winner:  Giles Scott
 Men's 470 winners:  (Stuart McNay, David Hughes)
 Men's 49er winners:  (Peter Burling, Blair Tuke)
 Women's RS:X winner:  Flavia Tartaglini
 Women's Laser Radial winner:  Marit Bouwmeester
 Women's 470 winners:  (Hannah Mills, Saskia Clark)
 Women's 49er FX winners:  (Martine Soffiatti Grael, Kahena Kunze)
 Mixed Nacra 17 winners:  (Jason Waterhouse, Lisa Darmanin)
 June 20–24: Kieler Woche in  Kiel
 Men's Laser winner:  Tobias Schadewaldt
 Men's Finn winner:  Deniss Karpak
 Men's 470 winners:  (Sime Fantel, Algor Marenic)
 Men's 49er winners:  (Justus Schmidt, Max Boehme)
 Women's Laser Radial winner:  Erika Reineke
 Women's 470 winners:  (Lara Vadlau, Jolanta Ogar)
 Women's 49er FX winners:  (Annemiek Bekkering, Daniel Bramervaer)
 Mixed Nacra 17 winners:  (Paul Kohlhoff, Carolina Werner)

Other sailing championships and the Nations Cup
 February 27 – July 19: 2015 ISAF Nations Cup
 February 27 – March 2: Oceania Final in  Brisbane
 Men's winner:  Chris Steele
 Women's winner:  Milly Bennett
 March 16–20: Africa Final in  Tunis
 Winner:  Mohamed Kamel Souissi
 April 2–5: South America Final in  Buenos Aires
 Event Cancelled
 April 22–26: Asia Final in  Zallaq
 Winner:  Kohei Ichikawa
 May 7–10: Europe Final in  Dublin
 Men's winner:  Pierre Rhimbault
 Women's winner:  Pauline Courtois
 May 28–31: North America and Caribbean Final in  San Diego
 Event Cancelled
 July 14–19: Grand Final in  Vladivostok
 Men's winner:  Vladimir Lipavsky
 Women's winner:  Nicole Breault
 July 2–8: ISAF Laser World Championship 2015 in  Kingston
 Winner:  Nick Thompson
 July 5–10: ISAF Nacra 17 World Championships 2015 in  Aarhus
 Winners:  (Billy Besson, Marie Riou)
 July 8–12: 2015 ISAF Women's Match Racing World Championship in  Middelfart
 Winner:  Lotte Meldgaard
 July 13–18: ISAF Youth RS:X World Championships 2015 in  Gdynia
 Men's Youth RS:X winner:  Yoav Omer
 Women's Youth RS:X winner:  Noy Drihan
 July 19–24: 2015 ISAF Team Racing World Championship in  Rutland (at the Rutland Sailing Club)
 Senior winners: Team  One (Michael Menninger, Justin Law, Adrienne Kamiler, Haley Kirk, Lucy Wallace, Tyler Sinks)
 Youth winners: Team USA Y1 (Eli Burnes, Henry Burnes, Charlie Hibben, Paige Dunleavy, Ginny Alex, Peter Barron)
 July 19–24: 2015 ISAF Laser Radial World Championship 2015 in  Aarhus
 Winner:  Marcin Rudawski
 July 26–31: ISAF Junior 470 World Championships 2015 in  Thessaloniki
 Men's Junior 470 winners:  (Guillaume Pirouelle, Valentin Sipan)
 Women's Junior 470 winners:  (Benedetta Di Salle, Alessandra Dubbini)
 August 9–14: ISAF Youth Laser 4.7 World Championships 2015 in  Medemblik
 Men's Under 16 Laser 4.7 winner:  Guido Gallinaro
 Men's Youth Laser 4.7 winner:  Alejandro Bethencourt Fuentes
 Women's Under 16 Laser 4.7 winner:  Julia Büsselberg
 Women's Youth Laser 4.7 winner:  Kateryna Gumenko
  won the gold medal tally.  won the overall medal tally.
 August 15–22: ISAF Youth Laser Radial World Championships 2015 in  Kingston
 Men's Youth Laser Radial winner:  Conor Nicholas
 Women's Youth Laser Radial winner:  Mária Érdi
 August 17–22: Women's and Men's Sailing ISAF Under 21 Laser World Championship 2015 in  Medemblik
 Men's Under 21 Laser winner:  Joel Rodriguez
 Women's Under 21 Laser Radial winner:  Maxime Jonker
 September 15–19: 2015 ISAF Youth Match Racing World Championship in  Świnoujście
 Winner: Team  and Sam Gilmour
 Second: Team  and Joakim Aschenbrenner
 Third: Team  and Marcus Ronnberg
 Fourth: Team  and Nevin Snow
 October 12–17: ISAF 470 World Championships 2015 in  Haifa
 Women's 470 winners:  (Lara Vadlau, Jolanta Ogar)
 Men's 470 winners:  (Mathew Belcher, William Ryan)
 November 26 – December 3: 2015 Para World Sailing Championships in  Melbourne (at the Royal Yacht Club of Victoria)
 For results, click here.
 December 27, 2015 – January 3, 2016: 2015 ISAF Youth Sailing World Championships in  Langkawi
  and  won 2 gold medals each.  won the overall medal tally.

Other sailing events
 January 7–11: OSAF 49er & 49er FX Oceanian Championships 2015 in  Perth
49er winners:  David Gilmour/Rhys Mara
49er FX winners:  Tess Lloyd/Caitlin Elks
 May 12–17: Men's Sailing EUROSAF Finn European Championships 2015 in  Split
 Men's winner:  Ivan Kljaković Gašpić
 Men's Junior winner:  Arkadiy Kistanov
 June 22–27: Sailing EUROSAF RS:X European Championships 2015 in  Palermo
 Men's RS:X winner:  Paweł Tarnowski
 Men's Under 21 RS:X winner:  Mattia Camboni
 Men's Youth RS:X winner:  Sil Hoekstra
 Men's Under 17 RS:X winner:  Sil Hoekstra
 Women's winner:  Bryony Shaw
 Women's Under 21 RS:X winner:  Stefania Elfutina
 Women's Youth RS:X winner:  Noy Drihan
 June 29 – July 4: Sailing EUROSAF 470 European Championships 2015 in  Aarhus
 Men's 470 winners:  (Ferdinand Gerz/Oliver Szymanski)
 Women's 470 winners:  (Tina Mrak/Veronika Macarol)
 July 6–12: EUROSAF 49er & 49er FX European Championships 2015 in  Porto
 Men's 49er winners:  (Justus Schmidt, Max Boehme)
 Women's 49er FX winners:  (Giulia Conti, Francesca Clapcich)
 July 19–24: 2015 EUROSAF Laser & Laser Radial European Championship 2015 in  Aarhus
 Men's Laser Winner:  Rutger van Schaardenburg
 Men's Laser Radial winner:  Marcin Rudawski
 Men's Under 21 Laser Radial winner:  Patrick Döpping
 Women's Laser Radial winner:  Tatiana Drozdovskaya

Water polo

World League
Men
 November 18, 2014 – June 28, 2015: 2015 FINA Men's Water Polo World League
 November 18, 2014 – April 14, 2015: First to tenth rounds for Europe only
 March 30 – April 4: 2015 Intercontinental Tournament for Africa, Americas, Asia & Oceania (men) in  Corona del Mar, Newport Beach, California
 June 23–28: FINA Men's Water Polo World League 2015 Super Final in  Bergamo
  defeated , 9–6, to win their ninth FINA Men's Water Polo World League title.  took third place.
Women
 November 25, 2014 – June 14, 2015: 2015 FINA Women's Water Polo World League
 November 25, 2014 – April 21, 2015: First to sixth rounds for Europe only
 April 28 – May 3: 2015 Intercontinental Tournament for Africa, Americas, Asia & Oceania (women) in  Auckland
 June 9–14: FINA Women's Water Polo World League 2015 Super Final in  Shanghai
 The  defeated , 8–7, to win their ninth FINA Women's Water Polo World League title. The  took third place.

European club competitions
 September 26, 2014 – May 30, 2015: 2014–15 LEN Champions League (final six in  Barcelona)
  Pro Recco defeated  VK Primorje, 8–7, to win their eighth LEN Champions League title.  CN Atlètic-Barceloneta took third place. 
 October 4, 2014 – April 3, 2015: 2014–15 Adriatic Water Polo League
  VK Primorje defeated fellow Croatian team, VK Jug, 15–9, to win their third Adriatic Water Polo League title.
 October 30, 2014 – April 11, 2015: 2014–15 LEN Euro Cup
  CN Posillipo defeated fellow Italian team, AS Acquachiara, 17–16 on aggregate, to win their first LEN Euro Cup title.

World water polo championships
 August 15–23: 2015 FINA Junior Water Polo World Championships for Women in  Volos
 The  defeated , 13–10, to win their second consecutive and fourth overall FINA Junior Water Polo World Championships for Women title.  took the bronze medal.
 September 4–12: 2015 FINA Junior Water Polo World Championships for Men in  Almaty
  defeated , 13–12, to win their fifth FINA Junior Water Polo World Championships title.

Other water polo events
 January 28 – February 1: UANA American Cup 2015 in  Markham, Ontario
 Men:  defeated , 8–6, in the final.  took third place. 
 Women:  defeated , 2–1, out of 3 matches played.
 May 24–29: 2015 FINA World Men's Water Polo Development Trophy in  Tehran
 Host nation, defeated , 13–5, to win their first FINA World Men's Water Polo Development Trophy title.  won the bronze medal.

References

 
2015 in sports
Water sports by year
Aquatics